Liliana Bodoc (21 July 1958 – 6 February 2018) was an Argentinian writer of fantasy.

Life
Liliana Bodoc was born in Santa Fe in 1958. When she was five years old, her family moved to Mendoza for work. There, she studied at the Universidad Nacional de Cuyo and was awarded a Bachelor of Arts degree in Literature. 
Raised as an atheist, she converted to Islam in 1994.

Bodoc authored La Saga de los Confines, a series of three fantasy novels that were originally published in 2000 in Spanish. The first of these books was translated into English as The Days of the Deer. Her work is very popular in Latin America and her style was admired by Ursula K. Le Guin (who died less than a month before Bodoc).

References

1958 births
2018 deaths
Argentine women novelists
Women science fiction and fantasy writers
People from Santa Fe Province
Place of birth missing
Place of death missing